Vlkolínec is a village under the administration of the town of Ružomberok in Slovakia. Historically, however, it was a separate village. The first written mention of the village came from 1376 and after 1882 it became part of Ružomberok. Its name is probably derived from the Slovak word "vlk", i.e. wolf.

Vlkolínec has been listed as a UNESCO World Heritage site since 1993, and is one of ten Slovak villages that have been given the status of a folk architecture reservations. This status was granted because the village is an untouched and complex example of folk countryside architecture of the region of the Northern Carpathians.

Vlkolínec, situated in the centre of Slovakia, is a remarkably intact settlement with the traditional features of a Central European village. It is the region’s most complete group of these kinds of traditional log houses, often found in mountainous areas. The village consists of more than 45 log houses each of them made up of two or three rooms. A wooden belfry from the 18th century as well as the baroque chapel have also been preserved. Houses No. 16 and 17 have been turned into a folk museum with all the instruments of daily life and work.

See also 
 Other historical reservations of folk architecture in Slovakia
 Brhlovce
 Čičmany
 Osturňa
 Plavecký Peter
 Podbiel
 Sebechleby
 Špania Dolina
 Veľké Leváre
 Ždiar
 Other similar World Heritage Sites
 Hollókő in Hungary
 Holašovice in Czech Republic
 Gammelstad Church Town in Sweden

Gallery

References

External links

 Official website

Villages in Slovakia
World Heritage Sites in Slovakia
Tourist attractions in Žilina Region
Ružomberok
Villages in Slovakia merged with towns